Heinrich "Heini" Bierling (23 August 1930 – 30 January 1967) was a German alpine skier. He competed in the men's slalom at the 1952 Winter Olympics.

Bierling died on 30 January 1967 after a severe training accident for the Munich Ski Championships. He was forced into paraplegia and died three weeks later.

References

External links
 

1930 births
1967 deaths
German male alpine skiers
Olympic alpine skiers of Germany
Alpine skiers at the 1952 Winter Olympics
Sportspeople from Upper Bavaria
People from Garmisch-Partenkirchen (district)
20th-century German people